Basil Ney, OBE was  Archdeacon of Gibraltar from 1963 to 1987.

Ney was educated at Lichfield Theological College. After a curacy at Gnosall he was Precentor at Gibraltar Cathedral. From 1954 to 1959 he was Chaplain at St Bartholomew's Hospital; and from 1959 to 1963 Chaplain at Embassy of the United Kingdom, Madrid.

References

Officers of the Order of the British Empire
Alumni of Lichfield Theological College
20th-century Anglican priests
Archdeacons of Gibraltar